Luuka Town, also known as Luuka Municipality, but often referred to simply as Luuka, is a town in Eastern Uganda. Prior to 1 July 2010, Luuka Town was known as "Kiyunga".  It is the principal political, administrative and commercial center of Luuka District.

Location
Luuka Town is located in Luuka District, Busoga Sub-region, in the Eastern Region of Uganda. The approximate coordinates of the town are:0°45'51.0"N, 33°19'55.0"E (Latitude:0.764167; Longitude:33.331944).

Population
, the exact population of Luuka Town is not publicly known.

Landmarks
The landmarks within the town limits or close to the edges of town include:

 The headquarters of Luuka District Administration
 The offices of Luuka Town Council
 Luuka Central Market
 Paidha Cultural Center

See also
Luuka District
Busoga sub-region
Eastern Region, Uganda

References

External links
 Luuka District Headquarters Located A "Kiyunga" (PDF)
 Luuka District To Pass Law Against Sugarcane

Populated places in Eastern Region, Uganda
Luuka District